Matthew Arnold School is a co-educational secondary school with academy status located in Staines-upon-Thames, Surrey, England. The school was opened by Lord Lucan on 24 May 1954 and educates pupils from the age of 11 ("Year 7") to 16 ("Year 11").

Admissions
The Matthew Arnold School is on the outskirts of the east of Staines-upon-Thames, south of the A308, towards Ashford. It has transport links via buses 117 and 290 trains Matthew Arnold takes in many pupils from a variety of schools located around Staines-Upon-Thames and surrounding areas, including Buckland Primary School, Laleham Church of England School, Riverbridge Primary School, Town Farm Primary School, Our Lady of Rosary, Stanwell Fields, Clarendon, Ashford Park, Echelford Primary School and many more.

History 

The Matthew Arnold School was started before the Second World War as a hospital and some pupils were admitted before hostilities started (the boys section). Aerial photographs taken on two occasions in 1933 illustrate some of the progress of construction of the new housing in the immediate vicinity of the survey area. Photographs also show the cropmarks of the supposed Roman enclosure in the playing fields of the school. Subsequent aerial photographs, taken at regular intervals from the late 1940s, to present also record cropmarks of the enclosure. The School was finished after the war as two Secondary Modern Schools. There was no state Grammar School in Staines-upon-Thames. Boys and Girls who passed the 11+ went to Ashford County School (Mixed) or Hampton Grammar School (boys only), (latterly Hampton School). With comprehensivisation on the 70s Matthew Arnold became a mixed comprehensive school, it became a comprehensive in 1975. The site was partially excavated in 1989-1990 and although the dating is inconclusive, it is suggested that the enclosures are of medieval date. The school became an academy in 2012, Construction is to be completed in January 2021 whereupon the current building will be demolished and external landscaping will take place and will be built by Wates Construction company with funding by the government’s Priority School Building Programme 2 (PSBP2) which aims to rebuild or replace the schools in the worst condition across the UK.

Academic performance
In January 2008 the school was awarded "The Most Improved School in the Country".

In 2014 the school was placed in special measures following an Ofsted inspection report that rated the school as 'inadequate'. As part of an improvement plan the school has joined the Bourne Education Trust, a Surrey-based multi-academy trust that includes Epsom and Ewell High School and Jubilee High School.

Fictitious alumni
Ali G, the fictional character created by comedian Sacha Baron Cohen, called it "Da Matthew Arnold Skool".

See also
 Matthew Arnold School (Oxford)

References

External links 
 
 Bourne Education Trust

Secondary schools in Surrey
Educational institutions established in 1975
Staines-upon-Thames
Academies in Surrey
1975 establishments in England